John Gordon Dobbs (June 3, 1875 – September 9, 1934) was an American professional baseball outfielder. He played five seasons in Major League Baseball (MLB) from 1901 to 1905 for the Cincinnati Reds, Chicago Orphans/Cubs, and Brooklyn Superbas.

In 582 games over 5 seasons, Dobbs posted a .263 batting average (585-for-2224) with 305 runs, 7 home runs, 207 RBIs and 78 stolen bases. He finished his career with a .949 fielding percentage playing at outfield and several games at second and third base and shortstop.

References

External links

Baseball Almanac
Baseball Historian

1875 births
1934 deaths
Baseball players from Tennessee
Major League Baseball outfielders
Cincinnati Reds players
Chattanooga Lookouts managers
Chicago Orphans players
Chicago Cubs players
Brooklyn Superbas players
Atlanta Crackers managers
Birmingham Barons managers
Chattanooga Warriors players
Mobile Bluebirds players
Mobile Blackbirds players
Terre Haute Hottentots players
Chattanooga Blues players
Springfield Governors players
Wheeling Stogies players
Utica Reds players
Nashville Vols players
Chattanooga Lookouts players
Montgomery Billikens players
Montgomery Rebels players